Graeme Watson (born 6 May 1986) is a Scottish professional footballer.

Watson began his career with Rangers and was first registered as a professional player in June 2003. He did not make an appearance for Rangers' first team, and after being released by them in the summer of 2006 he signed for Airdrie United. After one season with Airdrie, he signed for Albion Rovers, and was released by them at the end of the 2007–08 season.

Notes

External links

Newcastle Fans list of Airdrie players
Newcastle Fans list of Albion Rovers players

1986 births
Living people
Scottish footballers
Rangers F.C. players
Airdrieonians F.C. players
Albion Rovers F.C. players
Scottish Football League players
Footballers from Glasgow
Association football defenders